François Mendy (born 5 April 2000) is a French professional footballer who plays as a forward for Championnat National club Châteauroux.

Career
Mendy is a product of the youth academy of ÉS Trappes since the age of 9, and briefly moved to Castelroussin in 2018 before signing with the reserve team of Châteauroux. He made his professional debut with Châteauroux in a 2–1 Ligue 2 loss to Clermont Foot on 26 April 2021. On 5 May 2021, he signed his first professional contract with the club for 2 years.

Personal life
Born in France, Mendy is of Senegalese descent.

References

External links
 

2000 births
Living people
People from Trappes
French footballers
French sportspeople of Senegalese descent
Association football forwards
LB Châteauroux players
Ligue 2 players
Championnat National 3 players